

Quarter-finals

Angola vs Ghana

Ivory Coast vs Algeria

Egypt vs Cameroon

Zambia vs Nigeria

Semi-finals

Ghana vs Nigeria

Algeria vs Egypt

Third place play-off: Nigeria vs Algeria

Final: Ghana vs Egypt

knockout
2010 in Angolan football
2010 in Ivorian football
2010 in Cameroonian football
knock
knock
2009–10 in Nigerian football
2010 in Zambian sport
2009–10 in Algerian football